Most military schools in the United States are high schools that place a high emphasis on military preparation, academic rigor, and physical fitness. Most military schools are private and have high tuition, with financial aid available.

Federal Service Academies
 United States Military Academy (West Point, New York)
 United States Naval Academy (Annapolis, Maryland)
 United States Air Force Academy (Colorado Springs, Colorado)
 United States Coast Guard Academy (New London, Connecticut)
 United States Merchant Marine Academy (Kings Point, New York)

Senior Military Colleges
 Norwich University (Northfield, Vermont; four-year private university)
 The Citadel, The Military College of South Carolina (Charleston, South Carolina; four-year public college)
 Texas A&M University (College Station, Texas; four-year public university)
 University of North Georgia (Dahlonega, Georgia; four-year public university)
 Virginia Military Institute (Lexington, Virginia; four-year public college)
 Virginia Polytechnic Institute and State University (Blacksburg, Virginia; four-year public university)

State-supported maritime colleges and universities
Students at these academies are organized as cadets, and graduate with appropriate licenses from the U.S. Coast Guard and/or U.S. Merchant Marine. While no longer immediately offered a commission as an Officer within a service have the opportunity to participate in commissioning programs like Strategic Sea lift Officer Program (USN) and MARGRAD (USCG).
 California State University Maritime Academy (part of the California State University system)
 Great Lakes Maritime Academy (a division of Northwestern Michigan College)
 Maine Maritime Academy
 Massachusetts Maritime Academy
 State University of New York Maritime College (part of the State University of New York (SUNY) system)
 Texas A&M Maritime Academy (part of the Texas A&M University System)

Military junior colleges
Four institutions are considered Military junior colleges. These four schools participate in the Army's two-year Early Commissioning Program (ECP), an Army ROTC program in which qualified students can earn a commission as a Second Lieutenant after only two years of college. The four Military Junior Colleges are:
 Georgia Military College (Milledgeville, Georgia)
 Marion Military Institute (Marion, Alabama)
 New Mexico Military Institute (Roswell, New Mexico) 
 Valley Forge Military Academy and College (Wayne, Pennsylvania)

Private college-prep military schools

Admiral Farragut Academy (St. Petersburg, Florida; coeducational)
American Military Academy (Guaynabo, Puerto Rico; coeducational)
Army and Navy Academy (Carlsbad, California)
Benedictine College Preparatory (Richmond, Virginia)
Benedictine Military School (Savannah, Georgia)
Camden Military Academy (Camden, South Carolina)
Christian Brothers Academy (Albany, New York)
Culver Military Academy (Culver, Indiana)
Fishburne Military School (Waynesboro, Virginia)
Florida Preparatory Academy (Melbourne, Florida; coeducational from 2005)
Fork Union Military Academy (Fork Union, Virginia)
Hargrave Military Academy (Chatham, Virginia)
La Salle Institute (Troy, New York)
Leonard Hall Junior Naval Academy (Leonardtown, Maryland; coeducational)
Southern Preparatory Academy (Camp Hill, Alabama)
Marine Military Academy (Harlingen, Texas)
Massanutten Academy (Woodstock, Virginia; coeducational)
Missouri Military Academy (Mexico, Missouri)
New York Military Academy (Cornwall on Hudson, New York; coeducational)
North Valley Military Institute (Sun Valley, California; coeducational)
Oak Ridge Military Academy (Oak Ridge, North Carolina; coeducational)
Randolph-Macon Academy (Front Royal, Virginia; coeducational)
Riverside Military Academy (Gainesville, Georgia)
Saint Thomas Academy (Mendota Heights, Minnesota)
St. Catherine's Academy (Anaheim, California; Kindergarten - 8th Grade; all boys)
St. John's College High School (Washington, DC; first JROTC school in the USA; coeducational)
St. John's Northwestern Military Academy (Delafield, Wisconsin)
Southeastern Military Academy (Port St. Lucie, Florida)
TMI — The Episcopal School of Texas (San Antonio, Texas
Valley Forge Military Academy and College (Wayne, Pennsylvania)

Public schools
These military academies are part of the Junior Reserve Officers' Training Corps (JROTC) program and are partly funded by the United States Department of Defense. Chicago with six academies has more than any other city, a third of all in the country.
 Air Force Academy High School (Chicago, Illinois) 
 Bridgeport Military Academy First Responders (Bridgeport, Connecticut)
 Carver Military Academy (Chicago, Illinois)
 Chicago Military Academy (Chicago, Illinois)
 Cleveland Junior Naval Academy (St. Louis, Missouri)
 Delaware Military Academy (Wilmington, Delaware)
 First State Military Academy (Smyrna, Delaware)
 Franklin Military Academy (Richmond, Virginia; the country’s first secondary military academy)
 Georgia Military College (Milledgeville, Georgia; coeducational, public but not part of University System of Georgia)
 Hollywood Hills Military Academy (Hollywood, Florida)
 Kenosha Military Academy (Wisconsin)
 Marine Academy of Science and Technology (Sandy Hook, New Jersey)
 Marine Math and Science Academy (Chicago, Illinois)
 New Mexico Military Institute (Roswell, New Mexico; coeducational)
 New Orleans Military and Maritime Academy (New Orleans, Louisiana)
 Oakland Military Institute (Oakland, California)
 Philadelphia Military Academy
 Phoenix Military Academy (Chicago, Illinois)
 Rickover Naval Academy (Chicago, Illinois)
 Sarasota Military Academy (Sarasota, Florida)
 Summerlin Military Academy (Bartow, Florida)
 Utah Military Academy (Riverdale, Utah)
 Utah Military Academy - Camp Williams (Lehi, Utah)

Graduate schools
 United States Army Command and General Staff College (Fort Leavenworth, Kansas)
 United States Army War College (Carlisle, Pennsylvania)
 United States Army Warrant Officer Career College (Fort Rucker, Alabama)
 Naval War College (Newport, Rhode Island)
 Naval Postgraduate School (Monterey, California)
 Marine Corps University (Quantico, Virginia)
 Marine Corps War College (Quantico, Virginia) 
 Air Force Institute of Technology (Dayton, Ohio)
 USAF Air War College (Montgomery, Alabama)
 National Defense University (Washington, D.C.)
 The Judge Advocate General's Legal Center and School (Charlottesville, Virginia)
 Uniformed Services University of the Health Sciences (Bethesda, Maryland)

See also
 Association of Military Colleges and Schools of the United States
 US military staff colleges
 List of defunct United States military academies

References

Military schools and academies